Baydzharakh (Yakut: Бадьараах, Baçaraakh) is a term based in the Yakut language, referring to a roughly cone-shaped natural rock formation. They are usually composed of siltstone, silty peat or loam.

Description
Baydzharakhs form owing to thermokarst activity in periglacial areas. They are the result of a cryolithological process by which polygonal ice-wedges thaw within the permafrost.

In the first phase of the ice melting process baydzharakhs have a pillar-like shape. When the ice mass in the surrounding rocks is high, they swell and form rounded depressions known as alas (Алаас) in Yakut. Baydzharakhs come often combined witn alas depressions. 

Baydzharakh formations are found in different places across the East Siberian Lowland, such as Muostakh Island, Stolbovoy Island, Kotelny Island and the Ulakhan-Sis Range, as well as in scattered places of the Yana-Indigirka Lowland. In 1950 a lonely baydzharakh was the last vestige of now disappeared Semyonovsky Island in the Laptev Sea. They often occur together with Yedoma (Едома) complexes and in areas with ice-wedges of considerable thickness.

See also
 Kigilyakh

References

External links
Artificial megaliths of Cape Kigilyakh
Permafrost
Rock formations
Landforms of the Sakha Republic
Periglacial landforms